Caswell Creek is a small river in the Hart Ranges of the Northern Rockies of British Columbia.

The creek is named after Mr. Caswell, superintendent of the W.C. Arnett Construction Company, which constructed part of the John Hart Highway in 1954 (Hwy 97).

References 

Rivers of the Canadian Rockies
Rivers of British Columbia